Fietri is a village in Tuscany, central Italy, located in the comune of Gaiole in Chianti, province of Siena.

Fietri is about 30 km from Siena and 15 km from Gaiole in Chianti.

References 

Frazioni of Gaiole in Chianti